Ndombolo is a dance from the Democratic Republic of the Congo, that is also popular in other African countries such as Kenya, Tanzania and Madagascar, who consider it as a music genre.

This style of fast music, currently dominating dancefloors in central, eastern and western Africa and has since been performed by Dany Engobo, Awilo Longomba, Aurlus Mabele, Koffi Olomide and groups like Extra Musica and Wenge Musica, among others.

Modern ndombolo (2014-present) 
After years of decline of ndombolo output, partly caused by the emigration of popular ndombolo artistes to European countries, such as France, Belgium and the United Kingdom, especially after the Second Congo War, Congolese artiste Fally Ipupa released Original which became one of the biggest African songs of 2014, renewing interest in the genre. This was followed by popular releases such as selfie and Tshou Tshou Tshou by Koffi Olomide and also the popular Ecole by Fally Ipupa. New generation ndombolo artistes have emerged from Congo, like Innoss'B, Robinio mundibu, Gaz Mawete and London based BM. Inoss'B released a remix of his popular song Yope with popular Tanzanian bongo flava artiste Diamond Platnumz, which went on to become one of Africa's biggest songs of 2019, surpassing 150 million views on YouTube 18 months after its release. BM's released popular song Rosalina, featuring Ndombolo artiste Awilo Longomba, gave rise to the RosalinaChallenge trend of videos after an increase in popularity of the song. Ndombolo has also spread to regions outside central Africa, such as in France. French artistes of Congolese origin such as Dadju, Gims, Naza and popular French hip hop group 4Keus have produced successful ndombolo songs, singing in French instead of Lingala, the primary language of most Ndombolo songs. Bongo flava artiste Diamond Platnumz has also released successful crossover ndombolo Swahili songs, such as Yope with Innoss'B, Inama, a collaboration with Fally Ipupa and Waah, a collaboration with popular Congolese artiste Koffi Olomide.

Censorship attempts 
The hip-swinging dance to the fast pace soukous ndombolo has come under criticism on claims that it is obscene. There have been attempts to ban it in Mali, Cameroon and Kenya. After an attempt to ban it from state radio and television in the Democratic Republic of the Congo in 2000, it grew in popularity. In February 2005, ndombolo music videos in the DR Congo were censored for indecency, and video clips by Koffi Olomide, JB M'Piana, and Werrason were banned from the airwaves.

References

Democratic Republic of the Congo music
Dance music genres